Atiba is a Local Government Area in Oyo State, Nigeria. Its headquarters is in the town of Offa Meta.

It has an area of 1,757 km and a population of 168,246 at the 2006 census.
 
The postal code of the area is 203.

Some of the areas under Atiba Local Government includes Agunpopo, Aremo, Ashipa, Bashorun, Aaatan, Abolupe, Afonja, Agbaa, Agbaakin, Agbaka, Agbalowo-Asa, Agberinde, Ajalaruru, Ajegunle, Ajikobi, Akaparo, Akinku, Alaafin Palace, Alubata, Alusekere, Are-Eromasanyin, Asanminu, Ashamu, Ayetoro, Baago, Balogun Maje, Bangudu, Basorun, Boroboro,  Ekesan, Eleke, Elerinle, Elewi, Gaa Bale Fulani, Gbangba Taylor, Gbanta, Ijawaya, Ikolaba, Ile-Ewe, Ilowagbade, Ilusinmi, Iyalamu, Jowo Ese, Keeto, Koloko, Koso, Lagbondoko Area, Latula, Obagbori, Ode Moje, Ofa-Meta, Ogbegbe, Oke Oloola Area, Oke-Afin Area, Olokun Esin, Olugbile, Ona-Aka, Onireko, Onre Bare, Oota, Oridota, Origbemidele, Orokoroko, Otefon, Saakin, Saamu, Sabo, Sangolokeke, Sarumi, St. Andrews Area.

List of current and past public officials

Notable events and happenings in Atiba Local Government 

 The Akesan Market Fire Incident: The old Akesan market, also known as Oja Oba, located in the heart of town and only a few meters from the palace of the Alaafin of Oyo, Oba Lamidi Adeyemi, was destroyed by fire in the early hours of Sunday, 5 January 2020, devouring all stores and commodities valued more than N20 billion. Over 900 traders were left in shock and severe pains when the market fire shattered the serenity of the ancient town. However, the incumbent Governor of Oyo State, Governor Seyi Makinde came to the rescue by releasing N781.7 million to reconstruct the over 400 years old Akesan market. The reconstructed Akesan market was unveiled in June 2021.
 The establishment of Atiba University
 The on-going construction of Atiba Radio

References

Local Government Areas in Oyo State